Live at Birdland is a collection of live recordings made in 1953 and 1956 at New York's Birdland.

Track listing
 "Oh, Lady Be Good!" (7:47)
 "A Foggy Day" (8:10)
 "In a Little Spanish Town" 7:39
 "Lester Leaps In" (6:08))
 Theme: "Lullaby of Birdland" (0:55)
 Announcement (0:07)
 "Lester Leaps In" (6:07)
 Announcement 0:24
 "Polkadots and Moonbeams" (4:14)
 "Up ‘n Adam" (6:08)
 "In a Little Spanish Town" (3:20)
 Theme: "Lullaby of Birdland" (0:47)
 Announcement (0:10)
 "Three Little Words" (6:46)
 Lester and Announcer Speak (0:35)
 "These Foolish Things" (4:23)
 Announcement (0:10)
 "Blues in G" (5:45)
 "Tea for Two" (2:18)

Personnel
 Lester Young: tenor saxophone
 Jesse Drakes: trumpet
 Earl Knight: piano
 Aaron Bell: bass
 Lee Abrahams: percussion
 Count Basie Orchestra

Sources
Gridley, Mark C. Jazz Styles: History & Analysis. 9th N.J.: Prentice Hall, 2006. Print.

2007 albums